The Hungarian national championship for women's (commonly abbreviated NB I/A) is the top professional league for women's basketball in Hungary, organized and supervised by the Magyar Kosárlabdázók Országos Szövetsége.

History

Clubs of the 2020–21 season

List of champions

Selected foreign players
The following list contains players who played in the WNBA and/or achieved a medal on a major international tournament such as Olympic Games and World Championship or significantly contributed to the development of the league.

  Allison Tranquilli
  Jenny Whittle
  Hanna Zavecz
  Liset Castillo
  Simone Edwards
  Zane Tamane
  Jolanta Vilutytė
  Albena Branzova
  Yekaterina Lisina
  Maria Stepanova
  Aleksandra Crvendakić
  Sara Krnjić
  Jelena Milovanović
  Dragana Stanković
  Slobodanka Tuvić
  Lucila Pascua
  Essence Carson
  Kelsey Griffin
   Bria Hartley
  Quanitra Hollingsworth
  Amber Holt
  Briann January
  Vickie Johnson
  Brianna Kiesel
  Kelly Mazzante
  Kayla McBride
  Erica McCall
  Angel McCoughtry
  Beatrice Mompremier
  Nicole Ohlde
  Abi Olajuwon
   Danielle Page
   Allie Quigley
  Megan Walker
   Gabby Williams

References

External links
 Official Website

   
Basketball leagues in Hungary
Hungary
Sports leagues established in 1933
1933 establishments in Hungary
Women's basketball competitions in Hungary
Professional sports leagues in Hungary